Kerch Fishing Seaport is a fishing port of Black Sea (and Sea of Azov) located in the city of Kerch on the eastern shores Kerch peninsula at Kerch Bay just south of the Port of Kerch.

The port has 7 piers.

See also
 Port of Kerch

References

External links
 Ukrmorrichflot State Administration website

Buildings and structures in Kerch
Kerch
Ports of Crimea
Enterprises of Kerch
Fishing in Ukraine